Ambajora Shikaripara railway station is a main railway station in Shikaripara block of Dumka district, Jharkhand, India. Its code is SKIP. It serves Shikaripara town. The station consists of three platforms.

Facilities 
The major facilities available at Ambajora Shikaripara station are waiting rooms and vehicle parking.

Platforms
There are a total of three platforms and three tracks. The platforms are connected by foot overbridge. These platforms are built to accumulate 24 coaches express train.

Station layout

Major trains

Some of the important trains that serves Ambajora Shikaripara are :

 Howrah–Bhagalpur Kavi Guru Express
 Rampurhat–Jasidih Passenger

Gallery

Track layout

See also

References

External links 

 Ambajora Shikaripara Map

Railway stations in Dumka district
Howrah railway division